Canada's Drag Race: Canada vs. the World is an international season of Drag Race that premiered via Crave and WOW Presents Plus on November 18, 2022. The series, a spinoff of Canada's Drag Race, is the second edition of the Drag Race franchise to feature queens from numerous international versions of the competition: nine competitors appeared on this season who previously debuted on the American, British, Canadian, and Australian and New Zealand installments, including two contestants who also previously appeared on RuPaul's Drag Race All Stars.

Canada's Drag Race: Canada vs. the World follows RuPaul's Drag Race: UK vs the World, which brought together past competitors from the American, British, Canadian, and Dutch versions of the show as well as a host of the Thai spinoff. Also, it is the fourth season in the Drag Race franchise, following The Switch 2, All Stars 3, and All Stars 7, to feature a previous Drag Race winner returning to compete again.

On June 9, 2022, Crave released short clips of judges: Brooke Lynn Hytes, Brad Goreski, and Traci Melchor, announcing the upcoming series with a 2022 premiere date.

Ra'Jah O'Hara won the season, becoming the first contestant to win the competition on the third season she appeared on, while Silky Nutmeg Ganache placed as the runner-up.

Contestants

(Ages, names, and cities stated are at time of filming.)

Notes:

Contestant progress

Lip syncs
Legend:

Guest judges
Anjulie, singer
Sarain Fox, activist
Priyanka, winner of Canada's Drag Race season 1
Jeanne Beker, television personality
Hollywood Jade, dancer and choreographer
Gary Janetti, actor and husband of Brad Goreski
Joe Zee, fashion stylist
Monét X Change, contestant on RuPaul's Drag Race season 10, winner of All Stars 4, and runner-up on All Stars 7

Special guests
Guests who appeared in episodes, but did not judge on the main stage.

Episode 2: 
Justin Trudeau, Prime Minister of Canada

Episode 6: 
Aleksandar Antonijevic, photographer

Episodes

References 

2022 Canadian television series debuts
2022 in LGBT history
Canada's Drag Race